Hollywood Hillbillies is a 2014 American reality show (in the fly on the wall style), starring Michael Kittrell (also known for his YouTube channel, CopperCab).

Cast
 Michael Kittrell as himself
 Delores Hughes as herself
 Dee Dee Peters as herself
 John Cox as himself
 Paul Conlon as himself
 David Weintraub as himself

References

External links
 
 

2014 American television series debuts
2010s American documentary television series
2010s American reality television series
2015 American television series endings